Sir John Wilson, 1st Baronet (26 June 1844 – 28 July 1918) was a businessman and Liberal Unionist politician in Scotland.  He was Chairman of the Wilsons and Clyde Coal Company, and was Member of Parliament (MP) for Falkirk Burghs from 1895 to 1906.

He was made a baronet on 27 July 1906, of Airdrie in New Monkland in the County of Lanark.

References

External links 

1844 births
1918 deaths
Liberal Unionist Party MPs for Scottish constituencies
UK MPs 1895–1900
UK MPs 1900–1906
Baronets in the Baronetage of the United Kingdom
People educated at Airdrie Academy